Nares Strait is a waterway between Ellesmere Island and Greenland that connects the northern part of Baffin Bay in the Atlantic Ocean with the Lincoln Sea in the Arctic Ocean. From south to north, the strait includes Smith Sound, Kane Basin, Kennedy Channel, Hall Basin and Robeson Channel.  Nares Strait has a nearly permanent current from the north, powered by the Beaufort Gyre, making it harder to traverse for ships coming from the south.

In 1964, its name was agreed by the Danish (Stednavneudvalget, now Stednavnenævnet) and Canadian governments. The name derives from the British naval officer George Strong Nares.

The strait and neighbouring waters are usually hazardous for navigation and shipping. During August, however, it is usually navigable by icebreakers. Prior to 1948, only five vessels were recorded as having successfully navigated north of Kane Basin. In 2009 the ship Arctic Sunrise made the first known June transit into the Arctic Ocean.

Hans Island, a tiny island lying within the strait, had been claimed by both Denmark (on behalf of Greenland) and Canada until an agreement on June 14, 2022 settled the dispute by drawing a border across it. Other islands within the strait are Joe Island, Crozier Island, and the much larger Franklin Island.

Thule People reached the Nares Strait in the early 13th century, where they hunted with and traded with Vikings. Archeological remains of Thule Culture and Viking presence are found on Ruin Island.

References

Further reading

 Dawes, Peter R., and J. William Kerr. Nares Strait and the Drift of Greenland A Conflict in Plate Tectonics. Meddelelser om Grønland, 8. Copenhagen: [s.n.], 1982.
 Sadler, H. E. 1976. Water, Heat and Salt Transports Through Nares Strait, Ellesmere Island. "Journal of the Fisheries Research Board of Canada", 33, 2286–2295..
 Zreda, M, J England, F Phillips, D Elmore, and P Sharma. 1999. "Unblocking of the Nares Strait by Greenland and Ellesmere Ice-Sheet Retreat 10,000 Years Ago". Nature. 398, no. 6723: 139.

External links
 NASA: Missing 'Ice Arches' Contributed to 2007 Arctic Ice Loss
 'Ocean current observations from Nares Strait to the west of Greenland: Interannual to tidal variability and forcing' (2008)

Straits of Greenland
Straits of Qikiqtaaluk Region
Bodies of water of Baffin Bay
Canada–Greenland border
International straits
Articles containing video clips